VNIIRT - All-Russian Scientific Research Institute of Radio Engineering is a Russian manufacturer of air surveillance radars. It is part of the Almaz-Antey holding.

VNIIRT is the primary Russian designer of ground-based air surveillance radars. It performs scientific research and experimental design work on radars for both the strategic air defense forces and for the ground forces. It has devoted much attention to metric-band (VHF) radars, which have inherent counter-stealth capabilities and are relatively unaffected by meteorological obscuration. VNIIRT's products also have application to civil air traffic control.

1955; P-15 1RL13 Tropa FLAT FACE A, UHF (B/C-band),
1970; ST-68 (19Zh6) TIN SHIELD, E-band, Fun fact: First Soviet radar with digital coherent signal processing,
1974; P-19 1RL134 Danube FLAT FACE B, UHF (B/C-band)

VNIIRT designed air surveillance radars

References

External links
 Official website

Defence companies of Russia
Almaz-Antey
Defence companies of the Soviet Union
Electronics companies of the Soviet Union
Radar manufacturers
Research institutes in the Soviet Union